Frederick Buckley Newell (11 March 1890 - 12 August 1979) was an American bishop of The Methodist Church, elected in 1952.

Birth and family
Frederick was born 11 March 1890 in Hartford, Connecticut.  He married Emily Louise Lewis of Jersey City, New Jersey 15 January 1919.  They had two children:  Frederick Buckley Newell Jr, and Eleanor (Mrs. K.W. Steere).

Education
Frederick earned his A.B. degree from Wesleyan University, Middletown, Connecticut in 1913.  He earned an M.A. degree from Columbia University, New York City in 1916.  He earned his Bachelor of Divinity degree from Union Theological Seminary in New York also in 1916.

Honorary degrees
The Rev. Newell was honored with the D.D. degree from Mount Union College, Alliance, Ohio in 1931.  He also received a D.D. from Wesleyan University in 1938.  American University, Washington, D.C. honored Bishop Newell with the degree LL.D. in 1955.  He received this same honorary doctorate (LL.D.) from Syracuse University, Syracuse, New York in 1957.

Ordained ministry
Frederick was ordained deacon in the New York East Annual Conference of the Methodist Episcopal Church in 1917.  He was ordained elder in the same in 1919.  He served as the pastor of the People's Home Church and Settlement, New York City (1917–20).  He was then appointed the assistant executive secretary of the New York City Society of the Methodist Church (1920–30), and the executive secretary of the same (1930–52).

Rev. Newell was elected a delegate to the 1939 Uniting Conference of Methodism (having served as the chairman of the Commission on Church Union), as well as to the quadrennial General and Jurisdictional Conferences of The Methodist Church (1940–52).

Episcopal ministry

Death
Rev. Dr. Newell died in Groton, Connecticut, on Sunday, August 12, 1979, at the age of 89.  His body was committed August 16, 1979, in Cedar Hill Cemetery in Hartford, Connecticut.

References
Biography, from son Frederick Buckley Newell, Jr.
The Council of Bishops of the United Methodist Church 
InfoServ, the official information service of The United Methodist Church.  
Obituary 1 -- No Title. (1979, August 14). The Hartford Courant (1923-1984), p. 10.  Retrieved June 7, 2011, from ProQuest Historical Newspapers Hartford Courant (1923 - 1985). (Document ID: 983052642).

See also
 List of bishops of the United Methodist Church

American Methodist bishops
1890 births
Bishops of The Methodist Church (USA)
Religious leaders from Hartford, Connecticut
Wesleyan University alumni
Union Theological Seminary (New York City) alumni
1979 deaths
Commanders Crosses of the Order of Merit of the Federal Republic of Germany